The  is a special discount ticket issued in Japan that allows holders one-day unlimited rides on the local trains of Japan Railways Group (JR) during limited periods of the year.

One ticket is valid for five (not necessarily continuous) days (midnight to midnight), within a designated seasonal period. The ticket can be used by multiple passengers; for example, five passengers can use one entire ticket sheet for unlimited trips in one day instead of one passenger traveling individually on five days. A sheet of five tickets costs 12,050 yen (2,410 yen/ticket), and is ideal for long-distance travellers.

In the context of Japan Railways Group,  covers not only commuter trains that stop at every station, but also all passenger trains except for the Shinkansen, limited express, and express trains, which require express surcharges.

There is no age limit to buy the ticket despite the name "Seishun 18" (literally "Youth 18"). Although the back of the ticket is magnetized, it cannot be used in automatic ticket machines. The ticket is not available at standard ticket vending machines, but can be purchased from higher-end machines that sell Shinkansen tickets during the on-sale period under the heading O-Toku na Kippu, or over the counter at JR train stations, or from a travel agency during the on-sale period.

Ticket sale and usage 

The ticket is available for purchase during three different periods of the year. Although JR authorities state that these dates are subject to change, the dates of availability have remained unchanged since the ticket was first released in 1982 and can be considered standard data. When a ticket is purchased, it can be used only for that particular season. JR can refund full money only for tickets that remain unused (not stamped) before the end of the "Tickets on sale" period.

Ticket benefits

JR West Bus 
Since 2019, JR West Bus, the bus department of JR West, has given passengers who have Seishun 18 Tickets a discount on fares of three bus routes. The campaign is planned to be carried out 2020 through 2021. The three bus routes which are operated by JR West Bus, the Meikin Line - 名金線（Kanazawa Station↔Fukumitsu Station), the Enpuku Line - 園福線（Fukuchiyama Station↔Sonobe Station), and the Wakae Line - 若江線（Ōmi-Imazu Station↔Obama Station). Through this campaign, passengers may ride on the above bus routes at a flat fare of 800 yen each.

Passengers show the bus driver the Seishun 18 Ticket, and the driver gives a discount ticket when passengers get off the last terminal. Passengers cannot get off at non-registered bus stops. If you get off at the bus stops, the discount is annulled.

Hisatsu Orange Railway
You can ride on the entire line on the Hisatsu Orange Railway for one day. Tickets can be purchased from crews, station staffs, and stations tellers on the trains or stations.

Echigo Tokimeki Railway

Kampu Ferry
Kampu Ferry gives passengers who have Seishun 18 Tickets a discounts about fares between Shimonoseki and Pusan. The company allows discount of 50% for second class (4,500 yen/one-way/after discounting), discount of 36% for first class (8,000 yen/one-way/after discounting), and discount of 25% for deluxe class (13,500 yen/one-way/after discounting). Passengers must reserve a seat on the ferry and explain staff about using "Seishun 18 Kippu Tabi Daioen Waribiki (Ja:青春18きっぷ旅大応援割引)" by telephone before boarding on the ferry.

When you make a reservation, passengers must tell the staff their name, passport number, date of birth and gender. The company gives a discount about fares in terms of validity of the Seishun 18 Ticket. A round-trip ticket is counted as two tickets, so the tickets are discounted as two tickets. There is no discount when the passengers make a reservation at a one-way trip from Pusan Port to Shimonoseki.

Passengers must pay a fuel surcharge fee, and international tourist tax (1000 yen) except fares and Seishun 18 Tickets.

JR Hotel Group
JR Hotel Group gives guests who have Seishun 18 Tickets a discount. Guests must make a reservation at this hotel by the day before. Guests must show the hotel staff your Seishun 18 Ticket which is used on the same-day when you stay at hotel when you check into the hotel.

Exception

Chiyoda Line
Travel is permitted on local and semi-express trains on the Tokyo Metro Chiyoda Line between Kitasenju Station and Ayase Station without getting off, since the Chiyoda Line is deemed to JR Jōban Line.

History

It cost 8,000 yen and consisted of three 1-day tickets and one 2-day ticket. It also included a "Seishun 18" sticker for passengers to stick on their bags when travelling.

The price was raised to 10,000 yen for a booklet of four 1-day tickets and one 2-day ticket (equivalent to 1,666 yen per day, compared with 1,600 yen per day for the original ticket).

In summer 1984, the format was changed to a booklet of five 1-day tickets, with the price remaining at 10,000 yen, equivalent to 2,000 yen per day.

The price was raised to 11,000 yen in the winter of 1986 following the nationwide fare increase in July of that year.

With the introduction of the consumption tax in 1989, the price was raised to 11,300 yen for the summer ticket, and this was further increased to 11,500 yen in summer 1997 after the consumption tax increased from 3% to 5%. In 2014, the consumption tax was raised to 8%, leading to a price of 11,850 yen. In 2019, the consumption tax was raised to 10%, which raised the ticket's price to 12,050 yen.

The format of the ticket changed from the booklet to single ticket sheets in spring 1996 as a measure to prevent users from re-selling unused portions to ticket resellers.

In popular culture
The kawaii metal band Babymetal single "Headbangeeeeerrrrr!!!!!" specifically mentions the Jūhachi Kippu.

References

External links
 JR East discount ticket information 
 Japan Guide page for Seishun 18 ticket
Kampu Ferry
JR Hotel Group

Fare collection systems in Japan